The year 1981 in radio involved some significant events.

Debuts
March – KWNT (1580 AM) of Davenport, Iowa, switches from its longtime country music format – which it had held since the 1950s, including under its previous call sign KFMA – to a golden oldies format, emphasizing music of the 1930s through early 1950s. It is the first in a series of format switches at the frequency over the next 19 years – formats ranged from oldies to soul to black gospel – all of them unsuccessful.
March 1 - DJ Larry Monroe signs on at Austin's NPR station KUT and stays for 29 years.
March 30 – Radio stations across America interrupt regular programming following an assassination attempt against President Ronald Reagan outside the Hilton Hotel in Washington, D.C.
April 12 – WJOI/Pittsburgh flipped from beautiful music to Top 40, branded as "B94", and adopted the new call letters "WBZZ." That fall, WWJ-FM, a beautiful music station in Detroit, picks up the WJOI calls.
June 1 – CJCB-FM Sydney, Nova Scotia flips from Easy Listening to Country. Along with the format change, the station changes its call letters to CKPE-FM.
 September 22 – WCAU-FM in Philadelphia debuts a new Hot Hits format called "98 Now!" which sweeps the local ratings and inspires parent company CBS to look at converting its other FM stations to similar formats.
 October – "The Weekly Country Music Countdown," a three-hour weekly countdown program featuring the top 30 country hits of the week as reported by Radio & Records magazine. Hosted by radio personality Chris Charles, the show is the first successful rival to "American Country Countdown."

Births
 July 1 – Clemency Burton-Hill, English classical music presenter

Deaths
 February 10 – Leonard Plugge, English commercial radio promoter and politician (b. 1889)
 March 10 – Bob Elson, American "pioneer in broadcast journalism" best known for his broadcasting of baseball games of the Chicago Cubs and Chicago White Sox (b. 1904)

References

 
Radio by year